A quiver is a container for archery ammunition.

Quiver may also refer to:

Arts and entertainment
Quiver (video game), a 1997 first-person shooter video game
Quiver, the code-name for the computer game Half-Life during early development

Literature
Quiver (comics), a Green Arrow story arc
The Quiver, an English magazine published 1861–1956
Quiver, an imprint of the Quarto Group focusing on sex

Music
Quiver (band), a British 1970s rock band
Quiver (KTU album), 2009
Quiver (Ron Miles album), 2012
Quiver, a 1998 album by Wild Strawberries

Science and biology
Quiver (mathematics), a type of graph
Quiver diagram, a graph in physics
Vector field, a plot with arrows that indicate the direction and magnitude
Quiver tree, a South African succulent plant, Aloidendron dichotomum, related to aloes
A group of cobras

Places
Quiver Township, Mason County, Illinois, USA
Quiver Creek, a stream in Illinois, USA
Quiver River, a river in Mississippi, USA
Quiver Tree Forest, Namibia

Other uses
Quiverfull, a movement eschews all forms of contraception, including natural family planning and sterilization

See also

Surfboard quiver